The 1937 St. Louis Browns season involved the Browns finishing 8th in the American League with a record of 46 wins and 108 losses. Despite finishing last, the Browns as a team hit .285, which was higher than the American League average of .281. Pitching was the problem - the team's ERA was 6.00 compared to the American League average of 4.62.

Offseason 
 December 2, 1936: Ray Pepper was purchased from the Browns by the Buffalo Bisons.

Regular season

Season standings

Record vs. opponents

Notable transactions 
 April 13, 1937: Bill Trotter was signed as a free agent by the Browns.

Roster

Player stats

Batting

Starters by position 
Note: Pos = Position; G = Games played; AB = At bats; H = Hits; Avg. = Batting average; HR = Home runs; RBI = Runs batted in

Other batters 
Note: G = Games played; AB = At bats; H = Hits; Avg. = Batting average; HR = Home runs; RBI = Runs batted in

Pitching

Starting pitchers 
Note: G = Games pitched; IP = Innings pitched; W = Wins; L = Losses; ERA = Earned run average; SO = Strikeouts

Other pitchers 
Note: G = Games pitched; IP = Innings pitched; W = Wins; L = Losses; ERA = Earned run average; SO = Strikeouts

Relief pitchers 
Note: G = Games pitched; W = Wins; L = Losses; SV = Saves; ERA = Earned run average; SO = Strikeouts

Farm system 

LEAGUE CHAMPIONS: Mayfield

Terre Haute club folded, July 3, 1937

References

External links
1937 St. Louis Browns team page at Baseball Reference
1937 St. Louis Browns season at baseball-almanac.com

St. Louis Browns seasons
Saint Louis Browns season
St Louis Browns